is a Japanese footballer currently playing as a midfielder for Giravanz Kitakyushu.

Career statistics

Club
.

Notes

References

External links

2000 births
Living people
Japanese footballers
Association football midfielders
J3 League players
Urawa Red Diamonds players
Kataller Toyama players
Fukushima United FC players
Giravanz Kitakyushu players